Oxford College of Engineering and Management (OCEM) is one of the affiliated engineering college of Pokhara University. OCEM lies in Gaindakot of Nawalparasi District, Nepal. It is on bank of Narayani River. From the date of establishment it has been offering Higher secondary courses in different disciplines. It is offering engineering courses in two different disciplines and management in different two discipline of bachelors level.

Location
Oxford College of Engineering and Management is located in central Nepal (Gaindakot-02, Nawalpur). Its surroundings include the Narayani River

Academic programmes
For bachelor studies of Engineering, it offers electrical and electronic engineering  and  civil engineering. For bachelor studies of Management, it offers Bachelor of Business Administration and bachelor of computer applications.
For Higher Secondary students, it offers 10+2 in pure Science and Management.

Engineering
 Electrical and Electronic Engineering  
 Civil Engineering

Management
 Bachelor of Business Administration
 Bachelor of Computer Applications

Higher Secondary level
 Science 
 Management

Department
Department of BE (E&E) 
Department of BE (CIVIL)
Department of BBA
Department of BCA
Department of +2 Science
Department of +2 Management

Courses 
The courses offered by Oxford college of engineering and management and their capacity are as follows:

External links
Official website

See also
 Pokhara University

Pokhara University
2000 establishments in Nepal
Gandaki Province
Buildings and structures in Nawalpur District